The Workplace Safety and Health Council (WSHC) is an industry-led statutory body in Singapore responsible for the encouragement, regulation and enforcement of workplace health, safety and welfare. The WSHC can be considered as a successor institution to the Workplace Safety and Health Advisory Committee (WSHAC), which was formed in September 2005.

The WSHC comprises seventeen leaders from the major industry sectors (including construction, manufacturing, marine industries, petrochemicals and logistics), the government, unions and professionals from the legal, insurance and academic fields.

History 
On 29 April 2008, Prime Minister Lee Hsien Loong announced the creation of the Workplace Safety and Health Council to oversee safety standards and promote workspace safety culture. The council is an upgrade from the former Workplace Safety Health advisory committee.

Structure 
Under the WSHC, seven industry committees, three taskforces and two workgroups exist to address the specific workplace health and safety challenges found in their respective sectors:

 Construction and Landscape Committee
 Chemical Industries Committee
 Healthcare Committee
 Hospitality & Entertainment Industries Committee
 Logistics and Transport Committee
 Marine Industries Committee
 Metalworking and Manufacturing Committee
 Chemical Management & GHS Hazard Communication Taskforce
 Crane Safety Taskforce
 Work at Height Safety Taskforce
 Insurance Workgroup
 Facilities Management Workgroup

Three functional committees exist to identify, champion, and implement initiatives in the following areas:
 Engagement and outreach;
 Industry capability building; and
 Workplace health

The partners

The WSHC works closely with the Ministry of Manpower (MOM) and other government agencies, various industry sectors, unions and professional associations in development of strategies and programmes to raise workplace health and safety standards in Singapore.

Main functions and key programmes

Build capability of the industry to better manage workplace health and safety
The WSHC collaborates with other government agencies including the Workforce Development Agency (WDA). Utilising the Workforce Skills Qualification (WSQ) framework developed by WDA, the WSH Professional WSQ framework was established for the competency training of workplace health and safety professionals. Complementing the training development aspects, the WSHC conducts regular reviews and audits of accredited training providers so as to ensure a pool of highly credible and competent workplace health and safety training providers.

Promote workplace health and safety and recognise companies with good  performance
To build and promote workplace health and safety culture in the community, the WSHC actively organises events and programmes, engaging various stakeholders, to promote the importance of workplace health and safety and its benefits and provide the necessary guidance for its implementation. Some of these activities include the National WSH Campaign, the WSH Awards and the "Safety Starts With Me" campaign and various workplace health and safety seminars, conferences and workshops targeting different categories of workforce. The WSHC also has an up-to-date website, and the WSH Bulletin, an electronic bulletin that highlights the latest in workplace health and safety issues.

Setting acceptable WSH practices
The WSHC aims to promote the adoption of good workplace health and safety practices with various stakeholders. The WSHC also aims to work in collaboration with the other standard-setting bodies to develop national standards, as well as lead the development of industry guidelines, and establish approved codes of practices for the industry.

WSHC programmes

bizSAFE
 is a capability-building ten year programme that is tailored to assist the small and medium enterprise (SME) in building up their workplace health and safety capabilities.

References 

2008 establishments in Singapore
Singaporean culture
Occupational safety and health